Iranian Taboo is a 2011 documentary film by Iranian filmmaker Reza Allamehzadeh about the persecution of Baháʼís in Iran. It was selected for the 2012 Dawn Breakers International Film Festival as well as the Newport Beach and Uninvited Film Festivals.

References

Further reading
 </ref>

External links
 

2011 documentary films
2011 films
2010s Persian-language films
Documentary films about Iran
Bahá'í Faith in Iran
Documentary films about religion
Iranian documentary films